Bryony Naomi Gordon (born 5 July 1980) is an English journalist.

Early life
Gordon is the daughter of Sunday Mirror gossip columnist Jane Gordon. She was educated at a Kew College primary school and later attended the independent Queen's Gate School (an all girls school) in South Kensington. She briefly studied History of Art at University College London before dropping out after one term.

Career
Gordon began her career as an intern for the Daily Express, writing occasional feature articles for the newspaper. She then began writing a youth-oriented column for the Sunday Express, before writing for The Daily Telegraph'''s teen supplement in 2000. In 2001, Gordon joined the Daily Mirror gossip column known as The 3AM Girls. After the Mirror, Gordon resumed writing for The Daily Telegraph.

Since 2006, Gordon has written the "Notebook" column which appears each Thursday in The Daily Telegraph, as well as additional special features, such as interviews with public figures. She also writes the "How the Other Half Lives" column for The Sunday Telegraph's Stella magazine. In 2007, Gordon was shortlisted for Young Journalist of the Year, at the British Press Awards. Gordon also writes for the Telegraph blogs section.

In June 2014, Gordon published her first book, The Wrong Knickers: A Decade of Chaos, a memoir.

In June 2016, Gordon published her second book, Mad Girl, a memoir about her struggles with obsessive-compulsive disorder (OCD), bulimia, alopecia and drug dependency.

Personal life
Gordon married Harry Wilson, a financial journalist, on 5 July 2013. They have a daughter and live in Clapham in London. Gordon ran in the London Marathon on 23 April 2017 to support mental health charities.

Gordon has been open about her mental health difficulties, including OCD and depression. In April 2017 she began her Mad World podcasts with an interview with Prince Harry.  Gordon is a sober, recovering alcoholic.

Bibliography
 
 
Gordon, Bryony (2018). Eat, Drink, Run: How I Got Fit Without Going Too Mad.''

References

External links
 Bryony Gordon's column
 Bryony Gordon's blog

1980 births
20th-century British journalists
21st-century British journalists
21st-century English memoirists
21st-century English women writers
Living people
Alumni of University College London
English journalists
Daily Express people
The Daily Telegraph people
Daily Mirror people
English columnists
Writers from London
British women columnists
Gossip columnists
People with obsessive–compulsive disorder